Wait for Me is the platinum-selling debut album of Leeds band The Pigeon Detectives. The album was released for CD, 12" and digital download on 28 May 2007 and charted in the UK Albums Chart at number three in its first week of release. The album sold around 227,000 copies in 2007, reaching No. 70 in the end of year chart. It was certified platinum in June 2008. Upon the album's release, it received generally positive reviews from most critics.

History of the album

The album was recorded at Soundworks Studios in Leeds over a fairly long time span in the second half of 2006. In between recording the album the band toured vigorously, touring with the likes of The Holloways and Kaiser Chiefs. The first release from the album sessions was "I Found Out" which came out in November 2006 giving the band their first top 40 hit.

Following on from the success of "I Found Out", the song "Romantic Type" was chosen as the next single. On 2 January 2007 the song was given its first airing on BBC Radio One only 2 hours after the final master was finished. "Romantic Type" hit number No. 19 in the charts on 4 March 2007.

Later that month the band finished mixing the final album with Stephen Harris and Cenzo Townsend.

After a second top 20 hit with "I'm Not Sorry" hitting number No. 12, "Wait For Me" was released on 28 May 2007. The Pigeon Detectives released 2 more singles from the album: "Take Her Back" reached number 20 in August 2007 and a re-recorded version of "I Found Out", released on 12 November.

Bonus track

For the Japanese version of the album a re-worked version of the track "Let Go" was included. This track became available in the UK in November 2007 through iTunes.

Track listing
All songs by Oliver Main and Matt Bowman

Personnel

Matt Bowman – vocals
Oliver Main – guitar
Ryan Wilson – guitar
Dave Best – bass
Jimmi Naylor – drums

Charts

Weekly charts

Year-end charts

References

2007 debut albums
The Pigeon Detectives albums